Chercher (also Romanized as Char Char; also known as Cherchir and Chirchir) is a village in Zonuzaq Rural District, in the Central District of Marand County, East Azerbaijan Province, Iran. At the 2006 census, its population was 285, in 77 families.

References 

Populated places in Marand County